Lausanne was a 19th-century football club that fielded teams playing both the association football and rugby football codes. It is notable for being one of the twenty-one founding members of the Rugby Football Union.

History
Lausanne was established in 1867 with about sixty members. It fielded two teams of twenty aside for rugby matches but also played by Association rules. The derivation of the club's name appears to have been lost. The team's colours were violet with an amber stripe on the left arm.

On 26 January 1871, they sent representation to a meeting of twenty-one London and suburban football clubs that followed Rugby School rules (Wasps were invited but failed to attend) assembled at the Pall Mall Restaurant in Regent Street. E.C. Holmes, captain of the Richmond Club assumed the presidency. It was resolved unanimously that the formation of a Rugby Football Society was desirable and thus the Rugby Football Union was formed. A president, a secretary and treasurer, and a committee of thirteen were elected, to whom was entrusted the drawing-up of the laws of the game upon the basis of the code in use at Rugby School. Although Lausanne was considered prominent enough to have been invited, they did not gain any of the thirteen places on the original committee.

The club played its football at the Rosemary Branch Grounds (once east of the current Blake's Road, and now covered by the vast North Peckham Estate). Lausanne were known to have used the pub called the "Rosemary Branch", on Southampton Street, Peckham, to change. In 1874 the club relocated to New Cross Gate and then in 1875 to Dulwich, and whilst there they changed at the Greyhound pub in Dulwich Village.

Disbandment
The club disbanded in 1881 after just fourteen seasons.

Notable players
Despite their apparent prominence, the club produced no international players.

References

English rugby union teams
Rugby union clubs in London
Defunct English rugby union teams
Defunct football clubs in London
Association football clubs established in 1867
Association football clubs disestablished in 1881
Defunct football clubs in England
Rugby clubs established in 1867
1867 establishments in England
1881 disestablishments in England
Dulwich